The Neal Kocurek Memorial Austin Convention Center is a multi-purpose convention center located in Austin, Texas. The building is the home of the Texas Rollergirls, and was also home to the Austin Toros basketball team, until their move to the Cedar Park Center in nearby Cedar Park in 2010. The facility is also the primary "home base" for the internationally renowned South by Southwest technology, music and film conference/festival, held annually in March.

History

In the early 1980s civic leaders became concerned that Austin was being passed over as a site for major conventions because the city's main event facility, Palmer Auditorium, was too small. In 1983 the city council unveiled a concept for a $35 million convention center as part of a $350 million complex of hotels and parkland on the south shore of Town Lake (now Lady Bird Lake). Resistance to this plan by neighborhood groups near the proposed site and downtown business leaders caused the city to consider several other sites, finally choosing a downtown site near Waller Creek for construction.  Financing was provided for by a US$69 million bond sale, approved by referendum on July 29, 1989.  The grand opening ceremony took place on July 4, 1992.

The grand reopening took place on May 18, 2002. The enlarged Convention Center's five exhibit halls have a combined  of column-free space.

The Austin City Council changed the name of the Austin Convention Center on July 29, 2004 to honor civic leader Dr. W. Neal Kocurek (1936–2004), who helped rally community support for construction of a convention center for Austin. Kocurek died after suffering a stroke on March 29, 2004. The formal dedication took place on December 2, 2004.

On February 22, 2007, former NBA player and Naismith Memorial Basketball Hall of Fame member Dennis Johnson suffered a heart attack outside the convention center after a practice by the Austin Toros basketball team. Johnson, who was the Toros' head coach, died later that day.

References

External links

W. Neal Kocurek Bio

Culture of Austin, Texas
Convention centers in Texas
Event venues established in 1992
Defunct NBA G League venues
Austin Toros
Buildings and structures in Austin, Texas
Tourist attractions in Austin, Texas